T. Torechu  ( – 16 December 2019) was an Indian teacher and politician from Nagaland belonging to Naga People's Front. He was a legislator of the Nagaland Legislative Assembly.

Biography
Torechu was a government teacher before joining active politics. He was elected as a legislator of the Nagaland Legislative Assembly from Pungro Kiphire in 2003 as a Bharatiya Janata Party candidate. Later, he joined Naga People's Front. He was also elected from this constituency in 2008, 2013 and 2018.

Torechu died on 16 December 2019 at the age of 71.

References

1940s births
2019 deaths
Indian schoolteachers
Bharatiya Janata Party politicians from Nagaland
Naga People's Front politicians
People from Kiphire district
Nagaland MLAs 2003–2008
Nagaland MLAs 2008–2013
Nagaland MLAs 2013–2018
Nagaland MLAs 2018–2023